Marcantonio Brandolini d'Adda (18 July 1991)  is an Italian artist, designer and entrepreneur, CEO and Art Director of Laguna~B.

Biography
Son of Brandino Brandolini d'Adda and Marie Angliviel de la Beaumelle, Marcantonio Brandolini d'Adda lives and works in Venice. He succeeded his mother at the helm of Laguna~B, a company she founded in 1994 and active in glass processing and design.

In summer 2017, he held his first solo exhibition at ALMA ZEVI in Venice, creating a site-specific installation mixing brightly coloured cotissi glass.
In 2018, the exhibition was also presented in New York: for the occasion, director Mafalda Millies produced the film “Indefinito”, filming the performance of dancer Megumi Eda, who dances among Marcantonio Brandolini D'Adda's sculptures to an original score composed by Charles Derenne.
The performance was premiered at the Teatrino di Palazzo Grassi, Venice, in 2018.

His work "Indefinito n.1" entered the collection of Giancarlo Ligabue Foundation.

Marcantonio Brandolini d'Adda curated several editions of the Venice Glass Week, collective exhibition dedicated to the art of glass. As part of the Venice Glass Week, he established the Autonoma Prize and was a member of its jury in the 2020, 2021, and 2022 editions.

Furthermore, he co-founded Vital, a group of experts dedicated to preserving the Venetian Lagoon, and is a member of its Coordination Team along with Jane da Mosto. He also founded the Autonoma project, an international exchange programme with the Pilchuck Glass School in Washington, USA.

References

1991 births
People from Neuilly-sur-Seine
Brandolini d'Adda family
Living people